Michael Dogbe (born May 5, 1996) is an American football defensive end for the Arizona Cardinals of the National Football League (NFL). He played college football at Temple.

Professional career

Dogbe was drafted by the Arizona Cardinals in the seventh round (249th overall) of the 2019 NFL Draft. He played in 8 games for the Cardinals in his rookie year.

On September 8, 2020, Dogbe was waived by the Cardinals and re-signed to the practice squad the next day. He was elevated to the active roster on November 7, November 19, and November 28 for the team's weeks 9, 11, and 12 games against the Miami Dolphins, Seattle Seahawks, and New England Patriots, and reverted to the practice squad after each game. He recorded his first career sack against Seattle. On January 5, 2021, Dogbe signed a reserve/futures contract with the Cardinals.

On March 14, 2022, Dogbe signed a one-year contract extension with the Cardinals. He played in nine games before being released on November 10 and re-signed to the practice squad. He was promoted to the active roster on December 24.

References

External links
Arizona Cardinals bio
Temple Owls football bio

1996 births
Living people
American football defensive ends
Arizona Cardinals players
Parsippany Hills High School alumni
People from Morris Plains, New Jersey
People from Parsippany-Troy Hills, New Jersey
Players of American football from New Jersey
Sportspeople from Morris County, New Jersey
Temple Owls football players